Beignon is a commune in the Morbihan département in Brittany in northwestern France.

Population
Inhabitants of Beignon are called Beignonnais.

See also
Communes of the Morbihan department

References

External links

Mayors of Morbihan Association 

Communes of Morbihan